Kim Wielens (born 25 September 1977) is a New Zealand former basketball player who competed in the 2004 Summer Olympics.

References

1977 births
Living people
New Zealand women's basketball players
Olympic basketball players of New Zealand
Basketball players at the 2004 Summer Olympics